Stephen Vincent (born 26 May 1989) is an English dancer and choreographer. He is a former UK Latin Champion.

Early life 
Vincent was born in Manchester, England. Vincent began dancing at the age of six.

Amateur dancing career 
Vincent began his competitive amateur dancing career in 2001 partnering with Bryony Fielding. Vincent and Fielding amassed many titles during their partnership including Junior Latin Champions at the British Closed Championships in Blackpool in 2003. They remained partners until April 2004.

In July 2004, Vincent began dancing competitively with Amanda Couper. They remained partners for a year before calling it a day on their partnership in late 2005. Their year together provided many top five finishes including several first places, including the title of UK Closed Amateur 10 Dance champions in Bournemouth Summer Festival.

Professional dancing career 
In 2006, Vincent joined the touring dance company Burn the Floor. He has toured annually with the company all over the world including Australia, South Africa, Asia and North America.

In 2018 and 2019, Vincent joined Strictly Come Dancing professional, Giovanni Pernice as a dancer on his solo tour.

Dancing with the Stars 
In November 2019, it was confirmed that Vincent would be joining the cast of the Irish series of Dancing with the Stars as a professional dancer. He partnered Love Island contestant, Yewande Biala. They were the first couple to be eliminated from the competition.

In 2022, Vincent partnered with Irish Paralympic gold medal-winning swimmer, Ellen Keane. They reached the final, finishing as runners-up behind Nina Carberry & Pasquale La Rocca, alongside Jordan Conroy & Salome Chachua and Erica-Cody & Denys Samson.

In 2023, Vincent partnered with former state pathologist, Dr. Marie Cassidy. They were the second couple to be eliminated from the competition.

Highest and Lowest Scoring Per Dance

Performances with Yewande Biala

Performances with Ellen Keane 

In week 10, Vincent tested positive for COVID-19, so his partner, Ellen Keane danced with Ervinas Merfeldas.

Performances with Dr. Marie Cassidy

Personal life 
In May 2017, Vincent married fellow professional dancer, Kylee Vincent. They met while touring on Burn the Floor together.

References 

1989 births
Living people
British ballroom dancers